Qatar is one of the fastest growing countries in the field of tourism. According to the World Tourism rankings, more than 2.3 million international tourists visited Qatar in 2017. Qatar has become one of the most open countries in the Middle East due to its recent visa facilitation improvements, including allowing  nationals of 88 countries to enter visa-free and free-of charge.

Popular tourist attractions in Qatar include the following:

Attractions

Archaeological sites
 Al Da'asa
 Al Khor Island
 Jebel Jassassiyeh
 Lehsain
 Murwab
 Ras Abrouq
 Ruwayda
 Umm Al Maa
 Wadi Debayan
 Zubarah

Beaches

 Al Ghariyah Beach
 Al Thakhira Beach
 Dukhan Beach
 Fuwairit Beach
 Khor Al Adaid
 Ras Abrouq Beach
 Umm Bab Beach
 Zubarah Beach
 Maroona Beach
 Al Farkiya beach
 Simaisma Family Beach
 Al Wakra Beach
 Sealine Beach
 Al Kharij Beach
 Katara Beach

Forts
 Al Khor Towers
 Al Wajbah Fort
 Al Zubara Fort
 Ar Rakiyat Fort
 Barzan Towers
 Doha Fort
 Qal'at Murair

Museums

 Mathaf: Arab Museum of Modern Art
 Museum of Islamic Art, Doha
 National Museum of Qatar
 Qatar National Museum
 Sheikh Faisal Bin Qassim Al Thani Museum

National parks

 Al Reem Biosphere Reserve
 Al Wabra Wildlife Preserve
 Umm Tais National Park

Parks
 Al Bidda Park
 Aspire Park

Shopping centres
Doha
 Doha Festival City
 Landmark Mall Doha
 Souq Waqif
 Villaggio Mall

Al Rayyan
 Mall of Qatar

See also
 Qatar Tourism Authority

References

Qatar

Tourism in Qatar
Tourist attractions